Pennsylvania Route 760 (PA 760) is a state highway located in Mercer County, Pennsylvania. The route runs from an interchange with Interstate 80 (I-80) and I-376 in Shenango Township to an intersection with U.S. Route 62 Business (US 62 Bus.) and PA 718 in Sharon. The road was designated as the northernmost part of PA 60 until 2009, when I-376 was extended from the Pittsburgh area to I-80 along PA 60.

Route description

PA 760 begins at an interchange with I-80 and I-376 in Shenango Township, heading to the west as a four-lane freeway. South of here, the road continues as I-376. A short distance after beginning, the route reaches the PA 18 interchange, at which point the freeway ends. From this point, PA 760 turns to the northwest and becomes two-lane undivided Broadway Avenue. The road enters the city of Hermitage and passes a mix of woods and industrial establishments. The route turns more to the west as it comes into the borough of Wheatland and intersects PA 718 and the southern terminus of PA 418. At this intersection, PA 718 forms a concurrency with PA 760, and the two routes pass residential areas to the north and industrial areas to the south with a few businesses. The road enters the city of Farrell and turns to the north, continuing to the west of developed neighborhoods and to the east of Norfolk Southern's Wheatland Industrial Track railroad line as it passes more industry, including a large steel mill. PA 718/PA 760 crosses into the city of Sharon, where the road becomes Dock Street and passes under US 62, with a connection provided by local streets. From here, the road continues into downtown Sharon and reaches a roundabout at Connelly Boulevard and an intersection with US 62 Business. At this junction, PA 760 ends and PA 718 makes a left turn to head west on US 62 Business.

History
What is now PA 760 was originally designated as solely PA 718 and as an unnumbered road east of the PA 418/PA 718 intersection though the portion south of the PA 18 intersection was part of PA 18 constructed as a bypass of West Middlesex. When the PA 60 freeway was completed up to I-80, the PA 60 designation was applied onto this stretch of road. After I-376 was extended up the PA 60 freeway to I-80 from the Pittsburgh area in November 2009, PA 60 was reduced to its current alignment in Allegheny County while the former PA 60 north of I-80 became PA 760. The PA 760 trailblazers were installed in May 2010.

Major intersections

See also

References

External links

Pennsylvania Highways: PA 760

760